Harry Peter Cavers (27 December 1909 – 7 December 1995) was a Liberal party member of the House of Commons of Canada, barrister and judge. He was born in St. Catharines, Ontario.

The son of Harry A. Cavers and Mabel Laura Lyons, he was educated in St. Catharines and at the University of Toronto and Osgoode Hall. Cavers was called to the Ontario bar in 1935 and practised law in St. Catharines. He was named Queen's Counsel in 1961. Cavers served as a lieutenant in the Royal Canadian Naval Volunteer Reserve from 1942 to 1945.

He was first elected at the Lincoln riding in the 1949 general election then re-elected in 1953. Cavers was defeated at Lincoln in the 1957 election by John Smith of the Progressive Conservative party. Cavers made one further campaign for federal office in 1958 in an unsuccessful attempt to unseat Smith at Lincoln.

Cavers became a Dufferin County judge after he left the House of Commons. He died on 7 December 1995.

References

1909 births
1995 deaths
Judges in Ontario
Liberal Party of Canada MPs
Members of the House of Commons of Canada from Ontario
Politicians from St. Catharines
Canadian King's Counsel